RUN FOR HEROES was born in March 2020 as a response to the COVID-19 pandemic. On March 28, 2020 they launched the #Run5Donate5Nominate5 campaign which raised over £7 million for NHS Charities Together COVID-19 Appeal.

The campaign went viral on Instagram with over a million runners participating globally, including celebrities such as Sir Mo Farah, Ellie Goulding, Princess Eugenie, Jimmy Carr, Dame Jessica Ennis-Hill, Nick Grimshaw, Nicola Sturgeon and DJ Chris Moyles. The campaign was also referred to as the 5k challenge.

Background and origins

Run For Heroes was founded by Olivia Strong, a 27-year old documentary producer. Olivia thought of the idea while running around Arthur Seat in Edinburgh during lockdown in hope of raising £5,000 for NHS Charities Together COVID-19 Appeal. After launching the campaign, Olivia brought on India Pappalardo-Strachan (27) and Alice Taylor (27). India Pappalardo-Strachan branded Run For Heroes and continues to be the creative lead, while Alice Taylor pushed it out to press. The three woman worked together over the course of a month to create a campaign that grew from £5 to £5 million.

Campaigns

Run 5, donate 5, nominate 5 

Run For Heroes are best known for their first viral fundraising campaign that asked people to run 5k, donate £5 and nominate 5 others to do the same.
The campaign surpassed Virgin Money Giving records for an individual volunteer page, and in 24 hours raised over £1 million. This makes Run 5, Donate 5, Nominate 5 the largest viral fundraiser in the UK, and second globally after the Ice Bucket Challenge.

The 5k challenge also went viral in numerous other countries including the Netherlands, America, Canada, Spain and Australia. Altogether it raised around £8 million for COVID-19 causes globally.

Faster 5k Fridays 

Run For Heroes launched another challenge for The Care Workers Charity in partnership with Strava. It asked participants to run their fastest 5k every Friday for 5 weeks, raising over £20,000 for Charity.

Recognitions & awards

The campaign was recognised by Boris Johnson and awarded The Point of Light Award for outstanding volunteering. Olivia Strong was awarded the MBE in the Queen’s Birthday Honours 2020 in recognition of her role as Founder of Run for Heroes, and for services to fundraising during COVID-19.

References 

Charities based in the United Kingdom